Beatrice II (1193 – 7 May 1231) reigned as Countess Palatine of Burgundy from 1205 until her death. She was a member of the Swabian Hohenstaufen dynasty, the daughter of Count Otto I of Burgundy and Margaret, Countess of Blois, thereby a granddaughter of Emperor Frederick Barbarossa.

She was born in 1193, younger sister of Countess Joanna I of Burgundy. From the time of her father's assassination at Besançon in 1200, she was next-in-line to the county, eventually succeeding Joanna after her death in 1205. Her uncle Philip of Swabia, German king since 1198, had ensured her Burgundian heritage.

In 1208 she married Duke Otto I, Duke of Merania. They had:
Otto III, Count of Burgundy
Agnes of Merania (1215-1263)
Beatrix of Andechs-Merania
Margaret 
Adelaide, Countess of Burgundy
Elisabeth

References

Sources

1193 births
1231 deaths
Countesses of Burgundy
Hohenstaufen
Burgundy, Countess of, Beatrice II
13th-century women rulers
13th-century French people
13th-century French women
12th-century French people
12th-century French women